System Technology i changed its name to istudy Co., Ltd. in April 2016.

Became Kusim Co., Ltd. from May 2020.

System Technology-i Co. Ltd. is a Japanese e-learning company covering three lines of business: an enterprise-grade learning management platform, technical certified training, and publishing of e-content and technical books. All of the company’s products are branded with the iStudy name. The in-house developed learning management platform is delivered to corporate customers either in-house or as a Cloud-based application using the ASP/SaaS model. In addition, System Technology-i Co. Ltd. has developed a collaborative meeting solution for paperless meetings. In 2014, the company introduced multilingual support for its products and started to develop its activities in Malaysia and Singapore. The company was founded in 1997 and is based in Tokyo, Japan.

Brands

iStudy brand
iStudy brand was created in 1999  and is dedicated to learning solutions and services offered by System Technology-i Co. Ltd. Like many Japanese companies, System Technology-i Co. Ltd. is following the Kaizen philosophy in the development of its products and services.

@meeting brand
@meeting is a product for executive meeting functions, in particular the paperless meeting, Board portal and team collaboration tool. Products under this brand are available only outside Japan.

Solutions and Services
System Technology-i Co. Ltd. develops an e-Learning enterprise level solution that serves as the learning management system for financial institutions i.e. bank, insurance, health care organization, governments.

iStudy e-learning solutions include:

 iStudy Enterprise Server (LMS)
 iStudy Paperless Meeting and Training
 Learning services
 E-Learning
 Technical training

iStudy Enterprise Server (LMS)
iStudy Enterprise Server is a corporate Learning Management System targeted at medium and large sized organizations such as banks, health care or manufacturing. The product includes skills assessment, planning and management of the training, content creation, and delivery. The platform has multilingual support. In Japan, iStudy Enterprise Server is used by over 1 million users.

iStudy Paperless Meeting and Training
iStudy Paperless Meeting is a paperless meeting platform using a Smart device. It is used by executives and managers to facilitate internal meetings and encourage active meeting participation.
iStudy Paperless Training is software used by in-house trainers or Training Managers to deliver paperless training within an organisation.
Both options are available as an appliance server or cloud-based environment.

Learning Services

e-learning
iStudy e-learning is a selection of technical and business e-content
The technical courses cover topics such as: Oracle, Java/Solaris, IBM, Cisco, Miracle ZBX, while business courses focus on basic and advanced sales skills, business presentation delivery and marketing.

Technical training
iStudy is provides specially designed training and certification for advanced IT engineers covering such areas as Oracle database, IBM WebSphere Application Server, Miracle Linux operating system, Java or IBM Db2.
Training is delivered in the company's training venue located in Tokyo or the customer site.

Awards

The company has earned the following awards from Oracle: "Excellent Partner" award in 2010-2014; "University Delivery Award" in 2009; University Excellent Partner in 2008; and Outstanding Achievement Partner in 2007.

Technology timeline

 1999: iStudy Release: Self-learning software sold as a standalone DVD
 2002: iStudy Enterprise Licence
 2003: iStudy Skills
 2004: iStudy Enterprise Server
 2005: iStudy OnDemand
 2009: iStudy Green Option, a software focusing on paperless training
 2010: iStudy Enterprise Server V5 / iStudy Cloud V5. First Saas version of iStudy
 2012: iStudy Dynamic Cloud
 2014: iStudy Global Option. The paperless solution is internationalized (English, Simplified Chinese, Traditional Chinese). System Technology-i Co. Ltd. develop their activities in Asia ([Singapore] and [Malaysia])

Leadership
 Hidenori Matsuoka (松岡秀紀): President & CEO since he co-founded the company in 1997.
 Yuko Matsuoka (松岡 優子): Co-founder of the company and Executive Vice President.

Offices
System Technology-i Co. Ltd. has its headquarters in Higashi Ginza in Tokyo, Japan.

Competition
In the Learning management system Market, System Technology-i Co. Ltd. primarily competes against SAP, Skillsoft and Oracle in Japan.

See also

Collaborative software
Board portal
Talent management
Green computing

References

Japanese educational websites